Penny O'Brian [Cooke] (September 16, 1919 – April 29, 2010) was a Canadian outfielder who played in the All-American Girls Professional Baseball League during the  season. Listed at 5′2″, 120 lb., O'Brian batted and threw right handed.

Born in Edmonton, Alberta, Penny O'Brian was one of the 68 players born in Canada to join the All-American Girls Professional Baseball League in its twelve years history. Her career was cut short when her husband prompted her to quit the league and concentrate on her homemaking responsibilities.

Nicknamed ״Peanuts״, O'Brian began playing softball at age 14. She started her professional career in Edmonton, and gained notoriety for her blazing speed on the bases as well as in the outfield.

She married in 1944 Earl Cooke, who was serving in the Royal Canadian Navy during World War II conflict. While playing in Saskatoon, she was offered 65 USD a week to play in the All-American Girls Professional Baseball League, which was more than the 18 CAD she was making to drive a taxi. She accepted the offer and joined the league in 1945 with the expansion club Fort Wayne Daisies.

In just 83 games, the speedy O'Brian stole 43 bases to rank seventh in the league and led all outfielders with 236 putouts. In an interview, she claimed it was the best year of her life.

After the season, she returned home and went to raise their three children: Lucella, Robert and Georgena. Widowed in 1969, she worked as chief cleaner and dishwasher for the family business Motion Foods, retiring in 1985.

She is part of the AAGPBL permanent display at the Baseball Hall of Fame and Museum at Cooperstown, New York, unveiled in 1988, which is dedicated to the entire league rather than any individual personality. She also gained honorary induction into the Canadian Baseball Hall of Fame in 1998.

Penny O'Brian died in Vancouver at the age of 90.

Career statistics
Batting

Fielding

Sources

1919 births
2010 deaths
All-American Girls Professional Baseball League players
Baseball people from Alberta
Canadian baseball players
Sportspeople from Edmonton
Canadian expatriate baseball people in the United States
21st-century American women